Lena Micheel (born 29 April 1998) is a German field hockey player for the German national team.

She participated at the 2018 Women's Hockey World Cup.

References

External links

1995 births
Living people
German female field hockey players
Female field hockey forwards
Field hockey players at the 2020 Summer Olympics
Olympic field hockey players of Germany
21st-century German women